Stephen Joseph Elledge (born August 7, 1956, in Paris Illinois) is an American geneticist. He is currently the Gregor Mendel Professor of Genetics and Medicine in the Department of Genetics at Harvard Medical School and in the Division of Genetics at the Brigham and Women's Hospital, and is an Investigator with the Howard Hughes Medical Institute. He earned his B.Sc. in chemistry from the University of Illinois at Urbana–Champaign and his Ph.D. in biology from MIT. His research is focused on the genetic and molecular mechanisms of eukaryotic response to DNA damage. He is a member of the National Academy of Sciences and has been a Howard Hughes Medical Institute (HHMI) investigator since 1993.

Awards 
 2002 National Academy of Sciences (NAS) Award in Molecular Biology
 2005 Hans Sigrist Prize
 2005 Genetics Society of America Medal
 2010 Dickson Prize
 2012 Lewis S. Rosenstiel Award for Distinguished Work in Basic Medical Science from Brandeis University.
 2013 Gairdner Foundation International Award
 2015 Albert Lasker Award for Basic Medical Research alongside Evelyn Witkin "for discoveries concerning the DNA-damage response—a fundamental mechanism that protects the genomes of all living organisms".
 2016 Breakthrough Prize in Life Sciences
 2017 Gruber Prize in Genetics

References

External links 
His academic home page
His Howard Hughes Medical Institute bio
Elledge Lab Page

Living people
Howard Hughes Medical Investigators
Members of the United States National Academy of Sciences
Harvard Medical School faculty
Massachusetts Institute of Technology School of Science alumni
Recipients of the Albert Lasker Award for Basic Medical Research
1956 births
Fellows of the AACR Academy
University of Illinois Urbana-Champaign alumni
Members of the National Academy of Medicine